Dahlem is a municipality in the district of Lüneburg, in Lower Saxony, Germany. Dahlem has an area of 16.99 km² and a population of 527 (as of December 31, 2007).

References